Sune Lindbäck (27 December 1915 – 13 June 1970) was a Swedish equestrian. He competed in two events at the 1960 Summer Olympics.

References

External links
 

1915 births
1970 deaths
Swedish male equestrians
Olympic equestrians of Sweden
Equestrians at the 1960 Summer Olympics
People from Kalix Municipality
Sportspeople from Norrbotten County